Heidy M. Mader (1961 – 22 December 2022) was a British physicist and Professor at the University of Bristol who specialised in the study of the flow of complex multiphase fluids, including magma in volcanic systems and ice. She was the editor-in-chief of the Journal of Volcanology and Geothermal Research from 2016-2021. 

Mader died from cancer on 22 December 2022, at the age of 61.

Education
Mader earned her Bachelor of Science in physics from the University of York in 1985. She earned her Doctorate of Philosophy in Physics from the University of Bristol in 1991. Her dissertation was titled Water veins in polycrystalline ice.

Career
Mader began her career as a Research Physicist in the Technical Development Department at Cadbury-Schweppes from 1985 to 1987. During her time there, she studied the flow of chocolate, including Wispa, an aerated chocolate bar. From 1990-1992, she was employed as BP Venture Research Fellow in the Department of Earth Sciences, University of Bristol. In 1992, she took up a Lectureship in Environmental Sciences at the University of Lancaster, before returning to Bristol as Lecturer in the Department of Earth Sciences in 1996. She was promoted to Professor in 2013.

Family
Mader married Jon Keating in 2009.

References

External links

1961 births
2022 deaths
British women physicists
Academics of the University of Bristol
Alumni of the University of Bristol
Alumni of the University of York
Volcanologists